Nicholas Angelo Chickillo (October 17, 1930 – February 5, 2000) was an American football player who played one season with the Chicago Cardinals of the National Football League (NFL). He was drafted by the Cardinals in the fifteenth round of the 1953 NFL Draft. He played college football at the University of Miami and attended West Scranton High School in Scranton, Pennsylvania. Football players Tony Chickillo and Anthony Chickillo are his son and grandson, respectively.

References

External links
Just Sports Stats

1930 births
2000 deaths
Players of American football from Pennsylvania
American football linebackers
Miami Hurricanes football players
Chicago Cardinals players
Sportspeople from Scranton, Pennsylvania